Kelly Neal is an actor. He was featured in Oprah Winfrey's series Brewster Place.

Filmography
ABC Afterschool Special (1986-87) (Reggie Franklin) (2 episodes)
A Man Called Hawk (1989) (Frank) (Intensive Care)
True Blue (TV series) (1990) (Blue Monday)
Brewster Place (1990) (Abshu Kamau) (11 episodes)
Luther's Choice (1991) (Luther Payne) 
Law & Order (1990-93) (Lucian Bryan / Willie Tivnan) (2 episodes)
Lifestories: Families in Crisis (1994) (Dealer) (Brotherly Love: The Trevor Ferrell Story)
Shadow Box (2008) (CSI 2)
Guiding Light (1994-96) (Sidney Dickerson)

References 

{{cite news|url=https://news.google.com/newspapers?nid=373&dat=19940330&id=gecvAAAAIBAJ&sjid=WD8DAAAAIBAJ&pg=6262,1945547

External links
 

1967 births
American male actors
Living people